South Dennis may refer to: 
South Dennis, Massachusetts
South Dennis, New Jersey